Events from the year 1915 in the United States.

Incumbents

Federal Government 
 President: Woodrow Wilson (D-New Jersey)
 Vice President: Thomas R. Marshall (D-Indiana)
 Chief Justice: Edward Douglass White (Louisiana)
 Speaker of the House of Representatives: Champ Clark (D-Missouri)
 Congress: 63rd (until March 4), 64th (starting March 4)

Events

January–March

 January – While working as a cook at New York's Sloan Hospital under an assumed name, Typhoid Mary infects 25 people, and is placed in quarantine for life.
 January 12 
The Rocky Mountain National Park is established by an act of the U.S. Congress.
The United States House of Representatives rejects a proposal to give women the right to vote.
 January 21 – Kiwanis International is founded in Detroit, Michigan.
 January 26 – Rocky Mountain National Park is established.
 January 28 – An act of the U.S. Congress designates the United States Coast Guard, begun in 1790, as a military branch over 19 years.
 February 2 – Vanceboro international bridge bombing
 February 8 – The controversial film, The Birth of a Nation, directed by D. W. Griffith, premieres in Los Angeles.
 February 12 – In Washington, D.C. the first stone of the Lincoln Memorial is put into place.
 February 20 – In San Francisco, California the Panama–Pacific International Exposition is opened.
 March 3 – NACA, the predecessor of NASA, is founded.
 March 25 – The USS F-4 submarine sinks off Hawaii; 23 are killed.
 March 28 – The first Roman Catholic Liturgy is celebrated by Archbishop John Ireland at the newly consecrated Cathedral of Saint Paul in Saint Paul, Minnesota.

April–June

 May 6 – Babe Ruth hits his first career home run off of Jack Warhop.
 May 7 – The  is sunk on passage from New York to Britain by a German U-boat, killing 1,198.
 May 22 – Lassen Peak, one of the Cascade Volcanoes in Northern California, erupts, sending an ash plume 30,000 feet in the air and devastating the nearby area with pyroclastic flows and lahars. It is the only volcano to erupt in the contiguous United States between 1900 and the 1980 eruption of Mount St. Helens.
 June 9 – U.S. Secretary of State William Jennings Bryan resigns over a disagreement regarding his nation's handling of the Lusitania sinking.
 June 12 – "The class the stars fell on" graduates from the United States Military Academy at West Point, New York.
 June 21 – Guinn v. United States is decided by the Supreme Court of the United States, finding grandfather clause exemptions to literacy tests for voters to be unconstitutional.
 June 22 – The Imperial Valley earthquakes shook southeastern Southern California, causing six deaths and financial losses of $900,000. Each shock in this doublet earthquake measured 5.5  and had a maximum Mercalli intensity of VIII (Severe).

July–September
 July 24 – The steamer Eastland capsizes in central Chicago, with the loss of 844 lives.
 July 28 – The United States occupation of Haiti begins.
 August 5–August 23 – Hurricane Two of the 1915 Atlantic hurricane season over Galveston and New Orleans leaves 275 dead.
 August 17 – Jewish American Leo Frank is lynched for the alleged murder of a 13-year-old girl in Atlanta.
 August 31 – Jimmy Lavender of the Chicago Cubs pitches a no hitter against the New York Giants.
 September 11 – The Pennsylvania Railroad begins electrified commuter rail service between Paoli and Philadelphia, using overhead AC trolley wires for power.  This type of system is later used in long-distance passenger trains between New York City, Washington, D.C., and Harrisburg, Pennsylvania.

October–December
 October 2 – The 6.8  Pleasant Valley earthquake shook north-central Nevada with a maximum Mercalli intensity of X (Extreme), causing limited damage and pronounced fault scarps along the base of the Tobin Range.
 October 4 – Dinosaur National Monument is established.
 October 19 – Mexican Revolution: The U.S. recognizes the Mexican government of Venustiano Carranza de facto (not de jure until 1917).
 November 18 – Release of Inspiration, the first mainstream movie in which a leading actress (Audrey Munson) appears nude.
 November 23 – The Triangle Film Corporation opens its new motion picture theater in Massillon, Ohio.
 November 27 (Thanksgiving Night) – Second Ku Klux Klan established in Stone Mountain, Georgia by William Joseph Simmons.

Undated

 Emory College is rechartered as Emory University, and plans to move its main campus from Oxford, Georgia to Atlanta.
 The first stop sign appears in Detroit, Michigan.
 Colonel Francis G. Ward Pumping Station in Buffalo, New York, the largest in the US at this time, begins operation.
 Woman's Peace Party organized.
 Thomas Lyle Williams produces the mascara Maybelline.
 Only year in which all five surviving Marx Brothers appear together on stage.

Ongoing
 Progressive Era (1890s–1920s)
 Lochner era (c. 1897–c. 1937)
 U.S. occupation of Haiti (1915–1934)

Births
 January 1 – Tom Godwin, science fiction author (died 1980) 
 January 2 – John Hope Franklin, historian (died 2009)
 January 3 – Sid Hudson, baseball player (died 2008)
 January 4 – Meg Mundy, English-born actress (died 2016)
 January 5 – Arthur H. Robinson, geographer and cartographer (died 2004)
 January 6 – Don Edwards, politician (died 2015)
 January 9 – Anita Louise, actress (died 1970)
 January 14 – Mark Goodson, television game show producer (died 1992)
 January 16 – Leslie H. Martinson, television and film director (died 2016)
 January 20 – Edward Stewart, set decorator (died 1999)  
 January 22 – C. L. Franklin, minister and Civil Rights Activist, father of Aretha Franklin (died 1984)
 January 24 – Robert Motherwell, painter (died 1991)
 January 29 – John Serry, Sr., musician, composer and arranger (died 2003)
 January 30 – Ed Keats, admiral (died 2019)
 January 31
 Alan Lomax, folklorist and musicologist (died 2002)
 Thomas Merton, monk and author (died 1968)
 February 5 – Robert Hofstadter, physicist, Nobel Prize laureate (d. 1990)
 February 10 – Karl Winsch, baseball player and manager (died 2001)
 February 12 
 Richard G. Colbert, admiral (died 1973)
 Andrew Goodpaster, general (died 2005)
 February 14 – Ray Evans, composer (died 2007)
 February 16 – Jim O'Hora, college football coach (died 2005)
 February 21 – Ann Sheridan film actress (died 1967)
 February 23 – Paul Tibbets, World War II bomber pilot (Enola Gay) (died 2007)
 February 26 – Preacher Roe, baseball player (died 2008)
 February 28 – Zero Mostel, born Samuel Mostel, film and stage actor (died 1977)
 March 20
 Marie M. Runyon, political activist (died 2018)
 Sister Rosetta Tharpe, gospel singer (died 1973)
 March 29 – Helen Yglesias, novelist (died 2008)
 April 4 – Muddy Waters, born McKinley Morganfield, African-American blues musician (died 1983)
 April 7
 Stanley Adams, actor (died 1977)
 Albert O. Hirschman, German-born economist (died 2012)
 Billie Holiday, born Eleanora Fagan, African-American jazz blues singer (died 1959)
 April 16 – Joan Alexander, American actress (died 2009)
 May 1 – Archie Williams, athlete (died 1993)
 May 2 – Doris Fisher, singer and songwriter (died 2003)
 May 5 – Alice Faye, entertainer (died 1998)
 May 6 – Orson Welles, actor and director (died 1985)
 May 8 – Milton Meltzer, historical writer (died 2009)
 May 15 – Paul Samuelson, economist, Nobel Prize laureate (died 2009)
 May 26 – Sam Edwards, actor (died 2004)  
 May 27 – Herman Wouk, novelist (died 2019)
 June 10 – Saul Bellow, Canadian-born novelist, Nobel Prize laureate (died 2005)
 June 12 – David Rockefeller, banker and philanthropist (died 2017)
 June 15 – Thomas Huckle Weller, virologist, Nobel Prize laureate (died 2008)
 June 17 – David "Stringbean" Akeman, country music banjo player (died 1973) 
 June 19– Pat Buttram, actor (died 1994) 
 July 1 – Willie Dixon, blues musician (died 1992)
 July 5 – John Woodruff, African-American middle-distance runner (died 2007)
 July 7 – Peter H. Dominick, U.S. Senator from Colorado from 1963 to 1975 (died 1981)
 July 15 – Albert Ghiorso, nuclear scientist (died 2010)
 July 17 – Fred Ball, movie studio executive, actor and brother of Lucille Ball (died 2007)
 July 18 – Roxana Cannon Arsht, judge (died 2003)
 July 28
 Charles Townes, physicist, Nobel Prize laureate (died 2015)
 Frankie Yankovic, accordion player (died 1998)
 July 28 – Dick Sprang, comic book artist during the golden age of comics and explorer (died 2000)
 August 4 – William Keene, actor (died 1992)
 August 12 – Michael Kidd, choreographer (died 2007)
 August 13 – Katherine Loker, née Bogdanovich, philanthropist (died 2008)
 August 14 – Irene Hickson, baseball player (died 1995)
 August 19 – Ring Lardner Jr., film screenwriter (died 2000)
 August 25
 Norman Foster Ramsey, Jr., physicist, Nobel Prize laureate (died 2011)
 Walter Trampler, violist (died 1997)
 August 27 – Norman F. Ramsey, physicist, Nobel Prize laureate (died 2011)
 August 28
 Tol Avery, actor (died 1973)
 Simon Oakland, actor (died 1983)
 Tasha Tudor, illustrator (died 2008)
 September 23 – Clifford Shull, physicist, Nobel Prize laureate (died 2001)
 October 1 – Jerome Bruner, developmental and educational psychologist (died 2016)
 October 4 – Beverly Loraine Greene, African-American architect (died 1957)
 October 24
 Letitia Woods Brown, African-American academic historian (died 1976)
 Bob Kane, author and illustrator (died 1998)
 Roger Milliken, businessman (died 2010)
 October 6 – Ralph Tyler Smith, U.S. Senator from Illinois from 1969 to 1970 (died 1972)
 October 17 – Arthur Miller, playwright and essayist (died 2005)
 November 9 – Sargent Shriver, Peace Corps founder (died 2011)
 November 14 – Billy Bauer, cool jazz guitarist (died 2005)
 November 19 – Earl Wilbur Sutherland Jr., physiologist, Nobel Prize laureate (died 1974)
 November 26 – Earl Wild, pianist (died 2010)
 November 29
 Eugene Polley, electronics engineer (died 2012)
 Billy Strayhorn, composer, pianist and jazz innovator (died 1967)
 November 30 – Brownie McGhee, Piedmont blues musician (died 1996)
 December 12 – Frank Sinatra, singer and actor (died 1998)

Deaths 
 January 19 – Abram J. Buckles, soldier and jurist (born 1846)
 February 18 – Frank James, outlaw (born 1843)
 March 5 – Thomas R. Bard, U.S. Senator from California from 1900 until 1905 (born 1841)
 March 15 – Joseph Ackroyd, member of the New York State Senate (born 1847)
 April 1 – Laura Alberta Linton, American chemist (born 1853)
 April 14 – John Englehart, Northwest Frontier painter (born 1867)
 April 16 – Nelson W. Aldrich, U.S. Senator from Rhode Island from 1881 until 1911 (born 1841) 
 April 26 – John Bunny, silent film comedian (born 1863)
 April 29 – John R. Lindgren, founder of the banking firm Haugan & Lindgren (born 1855)
 May 7 – Sinking of the RMS Lusitania:
 Justus Miles Forman, writer (born 1875)
 Charles Frohman, theater producer (born 1856)
 Elbert Hubbard, writer and philosopher (born 1856)
 Alice Moore Hubbard, wife of Elbert (born 1861)
 Charles Klein, playwright (born 1867)
 Alfred Gwynne Vanderbilt, sportsman (born 1877)
 June 19 – Benjamin F. Isherwood, admiral (born 1822)
 July 16 – Ellen G. White, co-founder of the Seventh-day Adventist Church (born 1827)
 August 25 – Henry Overholser, businessman (born 1846)
 September 13 – Andrew L. Harris, Civil War hero and Governor of Ohio (born 1835)
 October 10 – Albert Cashier, born Jennie Hodgers, soldier (born 1843 in Ireland)
 November 14 – Booker T. Washington, African-American educator (born 1856)
 November 16 – Julius C. Burrows, U.S. Senator from Michigan from 1895 until 1911 (born 1837)
 November 21 – Dixie Haygood, magician (born 1861)
 December 22 – Rose Talbot Bullard, physician (born 1864)

See also
 List of American films of 1915
 Timeline of United States history (1900–1929)

References

External links
 
 

 
1910s in the United States
United States
United States
Years of the 20th century in the United States